Yassmin Gramian is an American politician. She served as Pennsylvania Secretary of Transportation, having been nominated by Pennsylvania Governor Tom Wolf in 2019 and confirmed unanimously by the Pennsylvania State Senate on May 27, 2020.

References 

Living people
State cabinet secretaries of Pennsylvania